The 2003–04 Maltese First Division (known as the MIA First Division for sponsorship reasons) started on 13 September 2003 and finished on 9 May 2004. Marsa and Mosta were relegated from Maltese Premier League. Tarxien Rainbows and San Gwann were promoted from Maltese Second Division with the latter (San Ġwann) having won a promotion playoff against Vittoriosa Stars. St. Patrick were the champions while Lija Athletic were runners-up. Both were promoted to Maltese Premier League. Tarxien Rainbows and Rabat Ajax were relegated to Maltese Second Division with the former having just clinched promotion only to go straight down again.

Participating teams

The Maltese First Division 2003–04 was made up of these teams:
 Lija Athletic
 Marsa
 Mosta
 Mqabba
 Naxxar Lions
 Rabat
 San Ġwann
 Senglea Athletic
 St. Patrick
 Tarxien Rainbows

Changes from previous season

 Msida Saint-Joseph and Balzan Youths were promoted from the First Division to the Premier League. They were replaced by Marsa and Mosta, both relegated from 2002-03 Maltese Premier League.
 Gozo and Xgħajra Tornados were relegated to the 2003–04 Maltese Second Division. They were replaced by Tarxien Rainbows, champions of 2003–04 Maltese Second Division and San Ġwann, runners-up.

Final league table

Results
For a complete set of results, see 1

Top scorers

References

Maltese First Division seasons
Malta
2

lt:Maltos pirmoji futbolo lyga